Tharwat Okasha (Also spelt Sarwat Okasha, ; 1921–27 February 2012) was an Egyptian writer, translator and influential minister of culture during the Nasserite era, and is known as the "founder of Egypt's cultural institutions."

Biography
Tharwat Okasha was an army officer involved in the Free Officers Movement, along with former president Nasser and his comrades, which toppled King Farouk of Egypt from his crown in what is known as the 23 July Revolution of 1952. As a child of an aristocratic family, Okasha received a good education, read books in foreign languages, and learned music very early on in his home. This background made him the most cultured and enlightened officer among his group of army officers.

Okasha received his PhD in literature from Sorbonne in the 1960s and worked as visiting scholar at the College De France. He published more than 70 books, including his three-volume memoir titled My Memoirs in Politics and Culture, which is considered a rich resource for historians of the Nasserite era; as well as a 38-volume encyclopedia of arts titled The Eye Listens and the Ear Sees.

Okasha served as the press attache at the Embassy of Egypt in Paris. He was appointed minister of culture in the late 1950s by President Nasser. Okasha held the position twice from 1958 to 1962 and, again, from 1966 to 1970. In his first term Okasha replaced Fathi Radwan in the post on 7 October 1958 and was succeeded by Mohammed Abdul Qader on 27 September 1962. Okasha's second term began on 10 September 1966, and he was in office until 18 November 1970 when Badr Al Din Abu Ghazi was named minister of culture.

During his terms in ministerial posts, he founded many cultural institutions that are still functioning and considered major Egyptian landmarks. For example, he founded the High Council for Culture and Arts (now called the Supreme Council for Culture), the General Egyptian Book Organisation and, most importantly, the Arts Academy.

His Works

Books and studies
 Encyclopedia of History of Art: (The eye hears and the ear sees):
 Ancient Egyptian Art: Architecture (1971).
 Ancient Egyptian art: Sculpture and Painting (1972).
 Ancient Egyptian Art: Alexandrian and Coptic Art (1976).
 The Ancient Iraqi Art (1974).
 Religious Islamic and Arab Painting Art(1978).
 Islamic Persian and Turkish Painting Art (1983).
 The Greek Art (1981).
 The Ancient Persian art (1989).
 Renaissance Art: Renaissance, Baroque and Rococo (1988).
 Roman art (1991).
 Byzantine Art (1992).
 Art of the Middle Ages (1992).
 Painting Art in the Islamic Moghol India (1995).

 Time and the Melody Songs: from Apollo's Songs to Turangalila (1980).
 Aesthetic Values in Islamic Architecture (1981).
 Greeks Between Mythology and Innovation (1978).
 Michelangelo (1980).
 Miraj Nameh (1981).
 Al-Wasiti's Art through Al-Hariri's Maqamat (1999).
 Dictionary of the Cultural Idioms.
 Cautious Fond of Wagner (1975).
 Modern Man Crowning Ramses' Era (1971).
 Hurricane from the East or Genghis Khan (1952). 
 Egypt in the eyes of Outsiders (1984).
 My Diary in Politics and Culture (1988).
 Series of lectures in College de France in 1973.

Translations
Okasha had translated books, many, including:
 The works of the poet Ovid such as Amores and Metamorphoses .
 The works of Khalil Gibran such as the Prophet.
 Ancient Egyptian Theatre, by Étienne Drioton (1967).
 Fond of Wagner, George Bernard Shaw (1965).
 Back to the Faith, by Henry Nick (1950).
 Mr. Adam, by Ban Frank (1948).
 Pastor's Pants, Thorne-Smith (1952).
 Mechanical War, Gen. Fuller (1942).

The most important achievements of culture and civilization
 Project of saving the Monuments of Nubia and the Temple of Abu Simbel and Philae Temple.
 Institutes of Ballet and Conservatoire, Cinema and Art Criticism, then these institutes included in the Academy of Arts.
 The New Egyptian Book Library and Archives (Dar al-Kutub).
 Cultural Palaces.
 Cairo Opera Ballet team.
 Sound and light shows in Giza pyramids and the Saladin castle and Karnak temple.
 The sun boats Museum.

References

1921 births
2012 deaths
Culture ministers of Egypt
Egyptian translators
20th-century translators
University of Paris alumni
Egyptian expatriates in France